Dick Garcia (born May 31, 1931) is an American jazz guitarist.

Career
Garcia began to play the guitar aged nine. In 1950, he was a member of Tony Scott's quartet. From 1952, he worked with George Shearing, Charlie Parker, Joe Roland, Milt Buckner, Johnny Glasel, Lenny Hambro, Aaron Sachs, and Bobby Scott. He recorded with Shearing in the late 1950s and early 1960s, then with Kai Winding.

Discography

As leader
 A Message from Garcia (Dawn, 1956)
 The Fourmost Guitars with Jimmy Raney, Chuck Wayne, Joe Puma (ABC-Paramount, 1957)

As sideman
 When Lights Are Low (MGM, 1955)
 I Hear Music (MGM, 1955)
 Lullaby of Birdland (MGM, 1957)
 Taking a Chance On Love (MGM, 1958)
 Jazz Conceptions (MGM, 1958)
 Satin Latin (MGM, 1959)
 A Jazz Date with George Shearing (MGM, 1961)
 The Swingin's Mutual! (Capitol, 1961)
 Satin Affair (Capitol, 1962)
 San Francisco Scene (Capitol, 1962)
 Smooth & Swinging (MGM, 1962)

With others
 Milt Buckner, Rockin' with Milt (Capitol, 1955)
 Nat King Cole, Nat King Cole (Capitol, 1992)
 Johnny Glasel, Jazz Session (ABC-Paramount, 1957)
 Lenny Hambro, Message from Hambro (Columbia, 1956)
 Joe Roland, Joe Roland Quintette (Bethlehem, 1955)
 Bobby Scott, Serenata (Verve, 1957)
 Tony Scott, Both Sides of Tony Scott (RCA Victor, 1956)
 Nancy Wilson, Guess Who I Saw Today (Capitol, 2005)
 Kai Winding, Solo (Verve, 1963)

References

1931 births
Living people
Guitarists from New York (state)
American jazz guitarists
American male guitarists
20th-century American guitarists
20th-century American male musicians
American male jazz musicians